Sindi may refer to:

Sindi people, an ancient people of the Taman Peninsula, nowadays Russia
Sindi, Estonia, a town in Pärnu County, Estonia
Sindi, Maharashtra, a town and municipal council in Wardha District, Maharashtra, India

Persons with the surname Sindi
Hayat Sindi, Saudi Arabian medical scientist
Kamil Sindi (born 1932)
Karoj Sindi (born 1989), Iraqi footballer
Rena Kirdar Sindi (born 1969), Iraqi author, socialite and party hostess

Persons with the given name Sindi
Sindi Dlathu (born 1974), a South African actress
Sindi Hawkins (born 1958), a Canadian politician
Sindi Watts, a fictional character from the Australian soap opera Neighbours, played by Marisa Warrington
Sindisiwe van Zyl (1976–2021), a South African physician

See also
 Sindhi (disambiguation)
 Cindy (disambiguation)
 Sinti, a Romani people of Central Europe